When Paddy Met Sally is a two-part television documentary shown on Channel 5  in the UK featuring Irish Traveller and Celebrity Big Brother 2011 winner Paddy Doherty and Sally Bercow, wife of the Speaker of the House of Commons. The show is similar to Wife Swap. 

The pair met in the Big Brother house in August 2011 and became unlikely friends. For the two one-hour episodes of When Paddy Met Sally, Bercow moved into Doherty's chalet on his travellers' site in north Wales, living by his rules in episode one and hers in episode two.  The programme first aired on 9 and 16 January 2012.

Ratings

External links

2012 British television series debuts
2012 British television series endings
British reality television series
Channel 5 (British TV channel) reality television shows
Television series by Endemol
English-language television shows